This is a list of shopping malls in India, sortable by name, location, year opened and Gross Leasable Area

Largest malls

Andhra Pradesh

Bihar

Chandigarh

Chhattisgarh

Delhi

Goa

Gujarat

Haryana

Jharkhand 
Here is a list of shopping malls in Jharkhand.

Karnataka

Kerala

Madhya Pradesh

Maharashtra

Odisha

Punjab

Rajasthan

Tamil Nadu

Telangana

Uttar Pradesh

Uttarakhand

West Bengal

References 

India
Shopping malls
Lists
Shopping malls